American International School — Accra, Ghana (AIS), was founded in 2006 to provide quality education for the international community. Located in East Legon, Accra, Ghana, AIS offers limited bus service from the Cantonments and Labone areas of Accra.

In May 2012 the student population was 240 students from over 30 countries.

Principal Mr smith lukeman
vice Principle shadrack walden haifisch 
And board of Authorities 

.

Curriculum
AIS provides an American curriculum for students from grades Pre-K3 to 12th grade. By limiting class size to less than 20 students, certified teachers are able to provide individualized instruction to students, who represent more than 30 countries. AIS currently offers standard academic curriculum as well as PE, Music, Art, French and the support of a Resource Room. High-school students have the opportunity to participate in Drama, Music Seminars and Model UN with other area schools. AIS is moving to facilitate technology in the classroom as well as developing sports programs for soccer, basketball and swimming. AIS has purchased property very near the present campus and plans to build a full service campus with swimming pool, basketball and soccer pitch.

Accreditation and membership
AIS was approved for candidacy by the Middle States Association of Colleges and Schools (MSA) and by the Association of Christian Schools International (ACSI) in May 2009.

See also

 African-Americans in Ghana

References

External links
 American International School official website.

American international schools in Ghana
Schools in Accra
Educational institutions established in 2006
International high schools
2006 establishments in Ghana